Harpersfield Bridge is a covered bridge spanning the Grand River in Harpersfield Township, Ashtabula County, Ohio, United States. * Currently disassembled for renovation 2023 * This double-span Howe truss bridge, one of currently 17 drivable covered bridges in the county, is the third longest covered bridge in Ohio at 228 feet. A  flood in 1913 washed away the land at the north end of the bridge, and the steel span was subsequently attached. The bridge features a walkway, added during its renovation in 1991–1992. The bridge also features an Ashtabula County MetroPark at its north end, and is listed on the National Register of Historic Places.

History
1868 or 1873 – Bridge constructed
 1913 – Northern part of land washed out, steel span added
1962 – Bypassed when State Route 534 was rerouted around the settlement of Harpersfield
1975 - Added to National Register of Historic Places  
1991-1992 and 2022-2023 – Bridge renovated

Dimensions
Length: 
Overhead clearance:

Gallery

See also
List of Ashtabula County covered bridges

References

External links

Harpersfield Covered Bridge Metropark (Ashtabula County Metroparks)
Ohio Covered Bridges List
Ohio Historic Bridge Association
Harpersfield Road Covered Bridge ("Ohio's Covered Bridges", Office of Structural Engineering, Ohio Department of Transportation)

Covered bridges in Ashtabula County, Ohio
National Register of Historic Places in Ashtabula County, Ohio
Covered bridges on the National Register of Historic Places in Ohio
Bridges completed in 1868
Road bridges on the National Register of Historic Places in Ohio
Steel bridges in the United States
Wooden bridges in Ohio